Okardaha  is a village in the Chanditala II community development block, Srirampore subdivision, Hooghly district in the Indian state of West Bengal.

Geography

Demographics
As per the 2011 Census of India, Okardaha had a total population of 2,944 of which 1,503 (51%) were males and 1,441 (49%) were females. The number of people who were under 6 years old were 268. The total number of literate people in Okardaha was 2,286 (85.43% of the population over 6 years).

Villages and census towns in the Kapasaria gram panchayat are: Kapashanria, Okardaha, Sahana, Sanka and Tisa.

Transport

The main road is Rd Number 31. It is the villages main road and is connected to the NH-19 and the Grand Trunk Road.

References 

Villages in Chanditala II CD Block